Ollolai is a comune at the centre of Barbagia, in the province of Nuoro (Sardinia, Italy).

It is the main town of the Barbagia di Ollolai.

Places of interest

Architecture 
The main square of the village was created in the early 20th century by diverting the stream that crossed it. Inside it lies a church dedicated to St. Michael the Archangel, which contains paintings by Carmelo Floris in the apse as well as a crucifix painted by Franco Bussu, an inhabitant of Ollolai. The oldest part of the church is a chapel dedicated to St. Bartholomew.

Near the town centre, there is another church dedicated to Anthony of Padua, where the Feast of Saint Anthony is traditionally held along with a lighting of a bonfire.

A few kilometres (miles) from the village towards the valley, there lies a church dedicated to Saint Peter, rebuilt in the 1970s after the demolition of a Romanesque church.

In a valley surrounded by granite peaks lies a church dedicated to Basil of Caesarea, built by the Basilian monks and used, after the expulsion of the Basilians, by the Franciscans. The adjoining convent was built later.

Water features 
The town is abundant in water features. The most famous is Gupunnio, the source of which is in the centre of the village, and was recently renamed Regina Fontium. There is also the fountain of Su Sapunadorju, and a few hundred metres (feet) from the town, Su Puthu, which was once used as a watering hole.

People
Michele Columbu, leader of the Sardinian Action Party (Sardinian nationalist party)
Franco Columbu (no relation), two time Mr. Olympia
Arnold Schwarzenegger, honorary citizen of Ollolai

References

Cities and towns in Sardinia